Zhelezovo is a rural locality (a village) in Nebylovskoye Rural Settlement, Yuryev-Polsky District, Vladimir Oblast, Russia. The population was 20 as of 2010. There are 3 streets.

Geography 
Zhelezovo is located 37 km southeast of Yuryev-Polsky (the district's administrative centre) by road. Chekovo is the nearest rural locality.

References 

Rural localities in Yuryev-Polsky District